Massimo Pigliucci (born January 16, 1964) is Professor of Philosophy at the City College of New York, former co-host of the Rationally Speaking Podcast, and former editor in chief for the online magazine Scientia Salon. He is a critic of pseudoscience and creationism, and an advocate for secularism and science education.

Biography
Pigliucci was born in Monrovia, Liberia, and raised in Rome, Italy. He has a doctorate in genetics from the University of Ferrara, Italy, a PhD in biology from the University of Connecticut, and a PhD in philosophy of science from the University of Tennessee. He is a fellow of the American Association for the Advancement of Science and of the Committee for Skeptical Inquiry.

Pigliucci was formerly a professor of ecology and evolution at Stony Brook University. He explored phenotypic plasticity, genotype–environment interactions, natural selection, and the constraints imposed on natural selection by the genetic and developmental makeup of organisms. In 1997, while working at the University of Tennessee, Pigliucci received the Theodosius Dobzhansky Prize, awarded annually by the Society for the Study of Evolution to recognize the accomplishments and future promise of an outstanding young evolutionary biologist. As a philosopher, Pigliucci is interested in the structure and foundations of evolutionary theory, the relationship between science and philosophy, and the relationship between science and religion. He is a proponent of an extended evolutionary synthesis to unify parts of biology not covered by the "modern synthesis" of the 20th century.

Pigliucci has written regularly for Skeptical Inquirer on topics such as climate change denial, intelligent design, pseudoscience, and philosophy. He has also written for Philosophy Now and maintains a blog called "Rationally Speaking". He has debated "deniers of evolution" (young-earth creationists and intelligent design proponents), including young earth creationists Duane Gish and Kent Hovind and intelligent design proponents William Dembski and Jonathan Wells, on many occasions.

His latest podcast Stoic Meditations consists of readings from the ancient Stoics, followed by his commentary to interpret the reading and put it into context.

Critical thinking and skepticism

Pigliucci is an atheist, but does not believe that science necessarily demands atheism, because of two distinctions: that between methodological naturalism and philosophical naturalism, and that between value judgements and matters of fact. He believes that many scientists and science educators fail to appreciate these differences. Pigliucci has criticized New Atheist writers for embracing what he considers to be scientism (although he largely excludes philosopher Daniel Dennett from this charge). In a discussion of his book Answers for Aristotle: How Science and Philosophy Can Lead Us to a More Meaningful Life, Pigliucci told  Skepticality podcast host Derek Colanduno, "Aristotle was the first ancient thinker to really take seriously the idea that you need both empirical facts, you need an evidence-based approach to the world and you need to be able to reflect on the meaning of those facts... If you want answers to moral questions then you don't ask the neurobiologist, you don't ask the evolutionary biologist, you ask the philosopher."

Pigliucci describes the mission of skeptics, referencing Carl Sagan's The Demon-Haunted World saying "What skeptics are about is to keep that candle lit and spread it as much as possible". Pigliucci serves on the board of NYC Skeptics and on the advisory board of the Secular Coalition for America.

In 1998, he debated William Lane Craig over the existence of God at the University of Tennessee, Knoxville. Also in 2001 he debated Craig about the same topic.

Massimo Pigliucci criticized the newspaper article by Pope Francis entitled, "An open dialogue with non-believers". Pigliucci viewed the article as a monologue rather than a dialogue and, in a response personally addressed to Pope Francis, wrote that the Pope only offered non-believers "a reaffirmation of entirely unsubstantiated fantasies about God and his Son...followed by a confusion between the concept of love and truth, the whole peppered by a significant amount of historical revisionism and downright denial of the ugliest facets of your Church."

Stoicism
Pigliucci became a popularizer of Stoicism and one of the driving forces in Stoicism's resurgence in the United States in the early twenty-first century. His 2015 essay for The New York Times on the topic was one of the most shared articles to date. Pigliucci said he always felt Stoicism was part of his Italian heritage, but he came to practice it after being disenchanted with Buddhism, though he finds both schools of thought to share similarities.

Neoskepticism
In 2021 Pigliucci announced a shift of interest away from Stoicism and towards, as he said, "a new synthesis, something that I have called Neoskepticism, and which uses the combined insights of the ancient Skeptics and Stoics to craft a better way to think about and especially live one’s life."

On consciousness
Pigliucci has criticized David Chalmers' Hard Problem of Consciousness, and he similarly is a critic of panpsychism. While he is a realist about consciousness, he thinks that claiming there is a distinction between the so called hard and easy problems of consciousness is a category error.

Rationally Speaking
In August 2000 Pigliucci started a monthly internet column called Rationally Speaking. In August 2005, the column became a blog, where he wrote posts until March 2014. Starting in February 2010, he co-hosted the bi-weekly Rationally Speaking podcast with Julia Galef, whom he first met at the Northeast Conference on Science and Skepticism, held in September 2009. The podcast is produced by the New York City Skeptics. The show has had many guests—scientists, philosophers—discussing matters of reason, skepticism and rationality. In 2010, Neil DeGrasse Tyson explained on the show his justification for spending large amounts of government money on space programs. He eventually printed the transcript of his performance as a guest on the show in his book Space Chronicles as a full chapter covering eight pages. Another episode in which Tyson explained his position on the label "atheism" received attention on NPR. Pigliucci left the podcast in 2015 to pursue his other interests. Galef continued to host the podcast solo.

Bibliography

Books

 
 Tales of the Rational (Freethought Press, 2000): A series of essays on atheism, straw-man arguments, creationism and the like.
 Phenotypic Plasticity (Johns Hopkins University Press, 2001): A technical volume on research concerning nature and nurture questions.
 Denying Evolution: Creationism, Scientism, and the Nature of Science. (Sinauer, 2002) : This book covers the evolution-creation controversy, better science teaching, and why people have difficulties with critical thinking.
 Phenotypic Integration (Oxford University Press, 2003) : A collection of technical essays on the evolution of complex biological organs.
 Making Sense of Evolution (with Jonathan Kaplan, University of Chicago Press, 2006): A philosophical examination of the fundamental concepts of evolutionary theory and practice.
 Evolution: The Extended Synthesis (with Gerd B. Muller, MIT Press, 2010)
 Nonsense on Stilts: How to Tell Science from Bunk (University of Chicago Press, 2010): This book presents a number of case studies on controversial topics in order to examine how science is conducted, how it is disseminated, how it is interpreted, and what it means to our society.
 Answers for Aristotle: How Science and Philosophy Can Lead Us to a More Meaningful Life (Basic Books, 2012)
 Philosophy of Pseudoscience: Reconsidering the Demarcation Problem (with Maarten Boudry, eds., University of Chicago Press, 2013)
 How to Be a Stoic: Using Ancient Philosophy to Live a Modern Life (Basic Books, 2017)
 The Stoic Guide to a Happy Life
 A Handbook for New Stoics: How to Thrive in a World Out of Your Control52 Week-by-Week Lessons

Articles
The following are a select few of Pigliucci's articles. Some may be found at the Internet Infidels' Secular Web.
 
 
 
 
 
 "The Virtuous Skeptic". Skeptical Inquirer. 41 (2): 54–57. 2017
Additional articles can be found on his web sites (see "External Links" below).

Book reviews

References

External links

 
 Massimo Pigliucci – Official website
 Massimo Pigliucci's new blog on Patreon
 Plato's Footnote – One of Pigliucci's former blogs
 How to be a Stoic – One of Pigliucci's former blogs
 Rationally Speaking – blog by Pigliucci about skepticism and humanism
 Dr. Pigliucci's Rationally Speaking Podcast
 Massimo Pigliucci on Secular Web
 Philosophy, Theory, and Practice in Biology
 
 

1964 births
Living people
Critics of alternative medicine
Critics of creationism
Critics of parapsychology
Evolutionary biologists
Extended evolutionary synthesis
Italian geneticists
University of Ferrara alumni
Italian philosophers
Italian biologists
Italian atheism activists
Italian humanists
Italian skeptics
Atheist philosophers
Lehman College faculty
Stony Brook University faculty
University of Connecticut alumni
University of Tennessee alumni
People from Monrovia
Writers from Rome